Modern urban planning in Canada can be traced back to the early 1900s, though Indigenous planning, an evolving practice, originated hundreds if not thousands of years ago. The planning profession originally focused on city layout, land subdivision and architecture and grew dramatically after 1945 due to the growth of Canadian cities. The profession now includes a diverse range of subjects such as urban sociology, data analysis and forecasting, municipal and planning law, management sciences and environmental sciences. According to the Canadian Institute of Planners, the profession has grown from only 45 practicing planners in 1949 to about 8,000 practitioners in 2022. This page compiles some of Canada's most notable planners according to their contributions to the profession.

List of notable Canadian planners and their contributions

References